The Blackheath Poisonings is a 1978 historical mystery novel by the British writer Julian Symons. It is a murder mystery set in the late Victorian era.

Plot
Two families, the Collards and Vandervents have lived together for many years in the same elegant house in the wealthy London suburb of Blackheath. The two have grown intermingled over the years, with numerous secrets. When they begin falling dead to mysterious stomach complaints, Paul Vandervent begins investigating.

Television adaptation
In 1992 it was adapted into a British television series of the same title featuring Zoë Wanamaker, Patrick Malahide, Christien Anholt and Ronald Fraser.

References

Bibliography
Forshaw, Barry. British Crime Film: Subverting the Social Order. Springer, 2012. . .
 Walsdorf, John J. & Allen, Bonnie J. Julian Symons: A Bibliography. Oak Knoll Press, 1996.

1978 British novels
Novels by Julian Symons
British crime novels
British mystery novels
British detective novels
British thriller novels
British historical novels
Collins Crime Club books
Novels set in London
Novels set in the 1890s
British novels adapted into television shows
Blackheath, London